Pau Masó (born January 14, 1986) is a Spanish actor, film director, producer, writer and model. He made his film debut in Aleksandr's Price (2013), which was written, directed, edited and produced by and starred him.

Film career

Masó has acted on a variety of films and shorts including; Keep the Party Going, One Minute, Bloody Night and Who's There?, and the actor stars in, and directs Haunted Poland, which was released on September 3, 2012. Who's There? received good reviews. Masó has three films in post production The Art of Losing, "Borderline" and What Spring Does with the Cherry Trees.

Aleksandr's Price
In the fall of 2011, Masó began writing a script about a male prostitute. In January 2012, production of the film started under the working title Simple Moves, and by March shooting began in the city of New York. According to IMDb, the film was shot in the period of 4 weeks approximately.

The film's first promotional teaser was released in April 2012 although the film didn't come out until fall 2013. The movie tells the story of an illegal Russian boy in Manhattan who, after losing his mother to suicide, is drawn into becoming a male prostitute. In a recent interview with a gay Russian magazine, the actor was quoted saying "To wrap this up, I also want to say that I find it highly insulting that people want to use religion to excuse their hate towards other people, rather they have a different sexual orientation, color, race or religion beliefs. There is just no excuse for that no matter what".

The film's final title in general release was changed from Simple Moves to Aleksandr's Price.

Borderline
In summer 2015, Masó began production of Borderline in "La Garrotxa", Catalonia, Spain. Shooting in various locations including "Sant Feliu de Pallerols", "Salt de Sallent de Rupit" and "Sant Privat d´en Bas"  Borderline is a horror film about two estranged sisters who, on the tenth anniversary of their mother's death, head to a mountain to scatter her ashes while they struggle to reconcile. The film stars Paula Ortiz, Mireia Vallés, Mariangels Punyet and Txema Lorente. The film is set to be released sometime in 2016. A teaser was released on August 25, 2015.

Filmography

Films

Television

References

External links 
 
 

1986 births
Expatriate male actors in the United States
Spanish male models
Living people
Spanish male film actors
21st-century Spanish male actors
People from Girona